Habibi Funk Records is a reissue record label based in Berlin, Germany dedicated to music from the Arab world. It was co-founded by Jannis Stürtz, who also works as a DJ using the name Habibi Funk. The label is mostly known for its albums and accompanying booklets of Arabic funk and soul bands from the 1960-80s.

History 
Jannis Stürtz first became interested in the music of the region while visiting Casablanca, Morocco in 2002. Habibi Funk's first release was al-Zman Saib, a 1970s reinterpretation of British rock group Free's song "All Right Now" by a Moroccan group called Fadaul et les Privileges.

Habibi Funk has re-released an expansive collection of Arabic funk and soul bands from the 1960-80s, including compilations. Apart from these, there are albums featuring a specific band, like Sudanese funk musician Kamal Keila, the "King of Sudanese Jazz", Sharhabil Ahmed or The Scorpions and Saif Abu Bakr, as well as North African musicians such as Al Massrieen, Ahmed Malek, Raze de Soare, Mallek Mohamed, and Hamid El Shaeri.

Editor's attitude towards post-colonialism in the music business 
Jannis Stürtz claims to have awareness of the political aspects of the label's work, addressing "the context of post-colonialism" and avoiding orientalist "stereotypical visual language." He also added that Habibi Funk Records licenses the music it reissues directly from the artists or their families, who get a 50% cut of the profits.

In an interview with The Vinyl Factory, Stürtz commented: "If you’re a European or Western label and you’re dealing with non-European artists’ music, there’s obviously a special responsibility to make sure you don’t reproduce historic economic patterns of exploitation, which is the number one thing when it comes to the post-colonial aspect of what we are doing."

See also 

 Music of Sudan
 Music of Morocco

References

External links 

 Official webpage

German independent record labels
World music record labels